The Grand Prix of Naples was an auto racing event, held in Posillipo, outside Napoli.

In its original incarnation, it began in 1934. Known as the Coppa Principessa di Piemonte in honor of Marie-José of Belgium, it continued from the same event held in 1933 in the Circuito Province Meridionale. It was held again from 1937 to 1939, although from 1938 it was purely a Voiturette race and attracted all-Maserati entries.

After World War II it was restarted as the Gran Premio di Napoli, starting in 1948.  The race took place at the  Circuito di Posillipo, going along the Via A. Manzoni and Via Nuova Parco. Starting in Formula Two regulations, but from 1954 it became either a sports car race or a non-Championship Formula One race. It was last held in 1962.

In 1998, the Naples circuit received the Rievocazione Storica Gran Premio di Napoli (Grand Prix of Naples Historic Revival). The name Gran Premio di Napoli now refers to a cycling event.

Winners

‡ - Not held in Naples

References

 
Sports car races
Naples
Naples
Auto races in Italy
Sport in Naples